Janes is an English patronymic family name.  Its root is believed to be from the possessive of the given name Jan (see Jayne), John or Ian.  In England, the name appears to have its densest roots in Bedfordshire and Gloucestershire as well as a few in the East End of London though migration has spread it across the country and the English-speaking world. There are two coats of arms associated with Janeses, one Gloucester-based and the other Kent-based. Janes is an uncommon given name. 

Equivalents exist in other languages, most often in pronunciation rather than spelling:
 Eanes
 Ianes
 Iōannēs (Greek)
 Janeš (Czech)

Notable people with the surname Janes
 Alfred Janes (1911–1999), Welsh artist
 Clara Janés (born 1940), Spanish poet, writer and translator
 Christine Janes (née Truman, born 1941), English tennis player
 Dominic Janes (born 1994), American actor
 Gordon Janes (1918–1985) accountant, business manager and politician in Newfoundland
 Henry Fisk Janes (1792–1879), American politician
 Jimmy Janes (1947–2020), American comics artist and storyboard artist
 J. Robert Janes (born 1935), Canadian author
 Lorenzo Janes (1801–1873), American lawyer, judge, businessman, and territorial legislator
 Martha Waldron Janes (1832–?), American minister, suffragist, columnist
 Paul Janes (1912–1987), German footballer
 Phil Janes (born 1958), science fiction comedy writer
 Richard Janes (born 1978), English actor, film and theatre director
 Rodney B. Janes (1892–1973), New York state senator

See also
 Jänes
 Jaynes